Sextus Pompeius Festus, usually known simply as Festus, was a Roman grammarian who probably flourished in the later 2nd century AD, perhaps at Narbo (Narbonne) in Gaul.

Work
He made a 20-volume epitome of Verrius Flaccus's voluminous and encyclopedic treatise De verborum significatione. Flaccus had been a celebrated grammarian who flourished in the reign of Augustus. Festus gives the etymology as well as the meaning of many words, and his work throws considerable light on the language, mythology and antiquities of ancient Rome. He made a few alterations, and inserted some critical remarks of his own. He also omitted such ancient Latin words as had long been obsolete; these he apparently discussed in a separate work now lost, entitled Priscorum verborum cum exemplis. Even incomplete, Festus' lexicon reflects at second hand the enormous intellectual effort that had been made in the Augustan Age to put together information on the traditions of the Roman world, which was already in a state of flux and change.

Of Flaccus' work only a few fragments remain; of Festus' epitome, only one damaged, fragmentary manuscript. The remainder, further abridged, survives in a summary made at the close of the 8th century by Paul the Deacon.

The Festus Lexicon Project has summed up Paul's epitome of Festus' De Verborum Significatu as follows:

Manuscript
The 11th-century Codex Farnesianus at Naples is the sole surviving manuscript of Festus. It was rediscovered in 1436 at Speyer by the Venetian humanist and bishop Pietro Donato. When he found it, half of the manuscript was already missing, so that it only contains the alphabetized entries M-V, and not in perfect condition. During the 15th century it has been scorched by fire and then disassembled by the antiquarian humanist Julius Pomponius Laetus.

Collating these fragmentary abridgments, and republishing them with translations, is a project being coordinated at University College London, with several objectives: to make this information available in usable form, to stimulate debate on Festus and on the Augustan antiquarian tradition upon which he drew, and to enrich and to renew studies on Roman life, about which Festus provides essential information.

Editions 
 Wallace Martin Lindsay (éd.): Sexti Pompei Festi De verborum significatu quae supersunt cum Pauli epitome. Teubner, Leipzig 1913 (online). Reprint Olms, Hildesheim 1965.

References

Citations

Bibliography

Further reading
 Acciarino, D. 2016. "The Renaissance Editions of Festus: Fulvio Orsini's Version." Acta Classica 59: 1-22.
 Cornell, Timothy J. 2014. "Festus." In The Fragments of the Roman Historians. Vol. 1, Introduction. Edited by Timothy J. Cornell, 67–68. Oxford: Oxford Univ. Press.
 Dahm, Murray K. 1999. "A Hendiadys in the Breviarum of Festus: A Literary Festus?" Prudentia: A Journal Devoted to the Intellectual History of the Ancient World. 31.1: 15–22.
 Glinister, Fay, and Clare Woods, with John A. North and Michael H. Crawford. 2007. Verrius, Festus, and Paul: Lexicography, Scholarship, and Society. Bulletin of the Institute of Classical Studies of the University of London Supplement 93. London: Institute of Classical Studies.
 Lamers, Han. 2013. "Creating Room for Doubt: A Reexamination of the editorship of Festus’ “Collectanea” (Rome, 1475)." Philologus 157:374–378.
 Lindsay, Wallace Martin. 1996. Studies in Early Mediaeval Latin Glossaries. Edited by Michael Lapidge. Variorum Collected Studies Series 467. Aldershot, UK: Variorum.
 Loew, Elias Avery. 1911. "The Naples MS. of Festus: Its Home and Date." Berliner Philologische Wochenschrift 31:917–918.
Marshall, Peter K. 1983. "Sex. Pompeius Festus." In Texts and transmission: A Survey of the Latin Classics. Edited by Leighton D. Reynolds, 162–164. Oxford: Clarendon.
 North, John. 2008. "Restoring Festus from Paul’s Epitome." Acta Antiqua Academiae Scientiarum Hungaricae 48.1–2: 157–170.
 Schmidt, Peter Lebrecht. 2004. "Festus." In Brill's New Pauly: Encyclopaedia of the Ancient World. Vol. 5, Equ–Has. Edited by Hubert Cancik and Helmuth Schneider, 407. Leiden, The Netherlands, and Boston: Brill.

External links

 Partial translations of De Verborum Significatione

 Sexti Pompei Festi De verborum significatu quae supersunt (Bibliotheca Augustana)

Grammarians of Latin
Silver Age Latin writers
Lexicographers
2nd-century writers
2nd-century Romans
Pompeii (Romans)